Daniela Hantuchová and Arantxa Sánchez Vicario were the defending champions, but Sánchez Vicario chose not to compete in 2003. Hantuchová played with Dája Bedáňová, but lost in the first round.

Lindsay Davenport and Lisa Raymond won the title.

Seeds

  Virginia Ruano Pascual /  Paola Suárez (final)
  Lindsay Davenport /  Lisa Raymond (champions)
  Jelena Dokić /  Rennae Stubbs (quarterfinals)
  Cara Black /  Elena Likhovtseva (quarterfinals)

Results

Draw

References

Bausch and Lomb Championships - Doubles
Doubles